"Whatever You Need" is a song by American recording artist Tina Turner. It was written by Russ Courtenay and Harriet Roberts, produced by Johnny Douglas, and released in January 2000 as the second single from Turner's tenth and final solo album, Twenty Four Seven (1999). The song reached number 11 in Finland and number 27 on the UK Singles Chart. The CD singles include live recordings of some of Turner's hits from her 60th birthday celebration in London in November 1999, including "The Best", "River Deep - Mountain High", "What's Love Got to Do with It" and "Steamy Windows", later released on the DVD Celebrate! - 60th Birthday Special.

Music video
The accompanying music video for "Whatever You Need", directed by Jake Nava, features Turner walking through a tunnel in a leather jacket and jeans. She then sits on some steps singing and some teenagers stop what they are doing and sit with her, singing along.

Track listings
 European CD single
 "Whatever You Need"
 "River Deep – Mountain High" (Recorded Live in London '99)

 European cassette single
 "Whatever You Need" – 4:48
 "The Best" (Recorded Live in London '99) – 5:21
 "River Deep – Mountain High" (Recorded Live in London '99) – 4:13

 European CD maxi single
 "Whatever You Need" – 4:48
 "The Best" (Recorded Live in London '99) – 5:21
 "River Deep – Mountain High" (Recorded Live in London '99) – 4:13
 "Whatever You Need" (Enhanced Video) – 4:48

 European CD maxi single
 "Whatever You Need" (Recorded Live in London '99) – 4:56
 "What's Love Got to Do with It" (Recorded Live in London '99) – 3:43
 "Steamy Windows" (Recorded Live in London '99) – 3:17

Charts

Release history

References

External links
 

Tina Turner songs
1999 songs
2000 singles
Music videos directed by Jake Nava
Parlophone singles
Songs written by Harriet (singer)
Virgin Records singles